Raymond Bossus (25 July 1903 – 6 February 1981) was a French politician.

Bossus served on the Senate as a representative of the Seine department from 8 June 1958 to 26 April 1959. He was called to replace Roger Garaudy of Paris on 1 November 1962, remaining in office until 25 June 1969, when his own resignation took effect, and was in turn succeeded by Serge Boucheny.

References

1903 births
1981 deaths
French Communist Party politicians
French Senators of the Fifth Republic
Senators of Paris
Senators of Seine (department)
French Senators of the Fourth Republic